In the United States, a slip law is an individual Act of Congress which is either a public law (Pub.L.) or a private law (Pvt.L.). They are part of a three-part model for publication of federal statutes consisting of slip laws, session laws, and codification. Session laws are compiled into the Statutes at Large (Stat.), and codification results in the United States Code (U.S.C.).

Public and private laws are prepared and published by the Office of the Federal Register (OFR) of the National Archives and Records Administration (NARA). At the end of a Congressional session, slip laws are compiled into the Statutes at Large, which are called "session laws", published by the Government Printing Office (GPO). Today, most of the public laws, but not private laws, are drafted as amendments to the United States Code.

See also
 United States Statutes at Large
 United States Code

References

Further reading
 "Slip Laws" from Federal Statutes: A Beginner's Guide at the Library of Congress

External links
 Public and Private Laws (1995–present) at Govinfo (U.S. Government Publishing Office)
 Public Laws (1951–present) at Congress.gov
 Private Laws (1951–present) at Congress.gov

American legal terminology
Legal research
Statutory law
United States federal legislation